CRZ may refer to:
Coastal Regulation Zone of India 
Honda CR-Z, a compact hybrid electric automobile manufactured by Honda